The Clementinum (Klementinum in Czech) is a historic complex of buildings in Prague which houses the National Library of the Czech Republic. 

Until recently the complex hosted the National, University and Technical libraries; the City Library was also nearby on Mariánské Náměstí. In 2009, the Technical library and the Municipal library moved to the Prague National Technical Library at Technická 6.

History

Its history dates from the existence of a chapel dedicated to Saint Clement in the 11th century. A Dominican monastery was founded in the medieval period, which was transformed in 1556 to a Jesuit college. In 1622 the Jesuits transferred the library of Charles University to the Clementinum, and the college was merged with the University in 1654. The Jesuits remained until their suppression in 1773, when the Clementinum was established as an observatory, library, and university by the Empress Maria Theresa of Austria.

The National Library was founded in 1781 and from 1782 the Clementinum was a legal deposit library. In 1918 the newly established Czecho-Slovak state took over the library. Since 1990, it has been the National Library. It contains a collection of Mozartiana, material pertaining to Tycho Brahe and Comenius, as well as historic examples of Czech literature. The architecture is a notable example of Baroque architecture and the Clementinum, covering 20,000 square metres, is the second largest complex of buildings in Prague after Prague Castle.

For several years before 2006, there was an ongoing debate on the possibilities of expanding the space for future library collections, as space in the current Clementinum buildings was expected to reach its limit by 2010. On 10 Jan 2006, the Prague authorities decided to sell the city-owned property located in the area of Letná, near the centre of Prague, to the National Library. In Spring 2006, an international architectural design competition for the new building was put up. The architect who won the competition was Jan Kaplický, but the decision was overruled, so the Czech National Library is still waiting for its final project. 

In 2005, the Czech National Library received the UNESCO Jikji prize (Memory of the World).

Curiosities

At one time the Clementinum was known as the third largest Jesuit college in the world.
 The oldest weather recording in the area of the Czech lands started in Clementinum in the year 1775. The recording continues through the present day.
 The Clementinum is mentioned in "The Secret Miracle" by Jorge Luis Borges. The main character has a dream of the library of Clementinum where the librarians look for God in the books of the library. One of the librarians says: God is in one of the letters of one of the pages of one of the four hundred thousand books of Clementinum. My fathers and the fathers of my fathers have looked for this letter; I myself have gone blind looking for it. So, a reader enters and delivers an atlas for the main character, saying that this atlas is useless. The main character opens the book at random, and find a map of India, touching one of its minimum letters and, then, finds God.
 The Baroque library hall inside Clementinum is known for its beautiful interior, including ceiling artwork by Jan Hiebl.

Gallery

See also 
 List of early modern universities in Europe
 List of Jesuit sites
 Strahov Monastery

References

External links

National Library of the Czech Republic
The History of Clementinum 
Virtual tour

1781 establishments in Europe
Buildings and structures in Prague
Culture in Prague
Education in Prague
National Library of the Czech Republic
Czech Republic
Tourist attractions in Prague
Deposit libraries
National Cultural Monuments of the Czech Republic